Pankow is the most populous and the second-largest borough by area of Berlin. 

Pankow may also refer to:

Places
Pankow (locality), a locality of Berlin in the Pankow borough
Panków, a village in south-west Poland
Pańków, a village in eastern Poland
Penkow, a municipality in Germany

Other uses
Pankow (surname)
Pankow (German band), a German band named after the district
Pankow (Italian band), an Italian electronic music band

See also
Berlin-Pankow station, a railway station in Berlin